A multiresolution analysis (MRA) or multiscale approximation (MSA) is the design method of most of the practically relevant discrete wavelet transforms (DWT) and the justification for the algorithm of the fast wavelet transform (FWT). It was introduced in this context in 1988/89 by Stephane Mallat and Yves Meyer and has predecessors in the microlocal analysis in the theory of differential equations (the ironing method) and the pyramid methods of image processing as introduced in 1981/83 by Peter J. Burt, Edward H. Adelson and James L. Crowley.

Definition
A multiresolution analysis of the Lebesgue space  consists of a sequence of nested subspaces

that satisfies certain self-similarity relations in time-space and scale-frequency, as well as completeness and regularity relations.

 Self-similarity in time demands that each subspace Vk is invariant under shifts by integer multiples of 2k.
 Self-similarity in scale demands that all subspaces  are time-scaled versions of each other, with scaling respectively dilation factor 2k-l.
 In the sequence of subspaces, for k>l the space resolution 2l of the l-th subspace is higher than the resolution 2k of the k-th subspace. 
Those integer shifts should at least form a frame for the subspace , which imposes certain conditions on the decay at infinity. The generating functions are also known as scaling functions or father wavelets. In most cases one demands of those functions to be piecewise continuous with compact support.

Important conclusions 
In the case of one continuous (or at least with bounded variation) compactly supported scaling function with orthogonal shifts, one may make a number of deductions. The proof of existence of this class of functions is due to Ingrid Daubechies.

 

Defining another function, known as mother wavelet or just the wavelet

one can show that the space , which is defined as the (closed) linear hull of the mother wavelet's integer shifts, is the orthogonal complement to  inside .

thus the set

See also
Multiscale modeling
Scale space
Time–frequency analysis
Wavelet

References 

 
 
 Crowley, J. L., (1982). A Representations for Visual Information, Doctoral Thesis, Carnegie-Mellon University, 1982.
 
 

Time–frequency analysis
Wavelets